The 2015 Vietnam Open was a professional tennis tournament played on hard courts. It is the first edition of the tournament which is part of the 2015 ATP Challenger Tour. It takes place in Ho Chi Minh City, Vietnam between 12 and 18 October 2015.

Singles main-draw entrants

Seeds

 1 Rankings are as of 11 October 2015.

Other entrants
The following players received wildcards into the singles main draw:
  Phạm Minh Tuấn
  Sumit Nagal
  Nguyễn Hoàng Thiên
  Lý Hoàng Nam

The following players received entry from the qualifying draw:
  Daniel Masur
  Vijay Sundar Prashanth
  Jeevan Nedunchezhiyan
  Flavio Cipolla

Champions

Singles

  Saketh Myneni def.  Jordan Thompson, 7–5, 6–3

Doubles

  Tristan Lamasine /  Nils Langer def.  Saketh Myneni /  Sanam Singh, 1–6, 6–3, [10–8]

External links
Official Website

Vietnam Open (tennis)
Vietnam Open (tennis)